The 2019 Copa do Brasil Finals were the final two-legged tie that decided the 2019 Copa do Brasil, the 31st season of the Copa do Brasil, Brazil's national cup football tournament organised by the Brazilian Football Confederation.

The finals were contested in a two-legged home-and-away format between Athletico Paranaense, from Paraná, and Internacional, from Rio Grande do Sul. Athletico Paranaense and Internacional reached the Copa do Brasil finals for the second and third time, respectively.

A draw by CBF was held on 5 September 2019 to determine the home-and-away teams for each leg. The first leg was hosted by Athletico Paranaense at Arena da Baixada in Curitiba on 11 September 2019, while the second leg was hosted by Internacional at Estádio Beira-Rio in Porto Alegre on 18 September 2019.

Athletico Paranaense defeated Internacional 3–1 on aggregate in the finals to win their first title. As champions, Athletico Paranaense qualified for the 2020 Copa Libertadores group stage and the 2020 Copa do Brasil round of 16.

Athletico Paranaense also earned the right to play in the 2020 Supercopa do Brasil against the 2019 Campeonato Brasileiro Série A champions.

Teams

Road to the final

Note: In all scores below, the score of the home team is given first.

Format
In the finals, the teams played a single-elimination tournament with the following rules:
The finals were played on a home-and-away two-legged basis. The home-and-away teams for both legs were determined by a draw held on 5 September 2019 at the CBF headquarters in Rio de Janeiro, Brazil.
If tied on aggregate, the away goals rule and extra time would not be used and the penalty shoot-out would be used to determine the winner. (Regulations Article 12.c).

Matches
Jonathan and Bruno Nazário (Athletico Paranaense) and Natanael, Matheus Galdezani and Rodrigo Dourado (Internacional) were ruled out of the finals due to injuries. Thiago Heleno and Camacho (Athletico Paranaense) were suspended for a doping violation and could not play the finals.

Andrés D'Alessandro and William Pottker (Internacional) suffered injuries before the second leg. William Pottker was ruled out of the second match but D'Alessandro was substitute although he did not play.

First leg
Athletico Paranaense defeated Internacional 1–0 in the first leg. In the 57th minute, after a combination of Nikão, Marco Ruben and Bruno Guimarães, Ruben passed the ball to Bruno Guimarães. The pass was deflected by Rodrigo Moledo and Edenílson allowing Bruno Guimarães scored the winning goal with a shot inside the box.

Second leg
In the second leg, Athletico Paranaense defeated Internacional 1–2. Léo Cittadini scored in the 24th minute after a play with Rony and Marco Ruben. Nicolás López equalized after Rodrigo Lindoso' shot off the post and Víctor Cuesta gained the rebound. During the injury time, Marcelo Cirino dribbled Edenílson, Rafael Sóbis and Rodrigo Lindoso before assist Rony, who scored the winning goal.

See also
2019 Campeonato Brasileiro Série A

References

2019
Finals
Copa do Brasil Finals
Club Athletico Paranaense matches
Sport Club Internacional matches